is a Japanese animation studio based in Nishi-ku, Yokohama.

Works

Television series

Original net animations

Films

References

External links

  
 

 
Japanese animation studios
Japanese companies established in 2016
Mass media companies established in 2016
Mass media in Yokohama